"Just Like Fire Would" is a song by Australian alternative rock band, the Saints, which is written by the band's lead singer, Chris Bailey, and was released as a single in March 1986. It was the lead single from their seventh studio album, All Fools Day (April 1986), and peaked at No. 29 on the Kent Music Report Singles Chart. It was produced by Hugh Jones, who had co-produced the album with Bailey. AllMusic's John Dougan reviewed All Fools Day and opined, "One listen to songs as grabbing as 'Celtic Ballad' or the great 'Just Like Fire Would' (which is kind of a neat pun) will convince you that despite the differences, the new Saints were a good band for completely different reasons than the old Saints."

In January 2018, as part of Triple M's "Ozzest 100", the 'most Australian' songs of all time, "Just Like Fire Would" was ranked number 88.

Charts

Bruce Springsteen version

Bruce Springsteen and the E Street Band performed "Just like Fire Would" during the opening show of the Australian leg on their Wrecking Ball Tour in 2013 and Springsteen released a studio version of the song on his album, High Hopes (14 January 2014). "Just like Fire Would" was released as the second single from the album. On 22 January 2014 Springsteen also released a music video for the song.

References

External links
 
 
 

1986 singles
Bruce Springsteen songs
The Saints (Australian band) songs
Song recordings produced by Ron Aniello
Song recordings produced by Hugh Jones (producer)
1986 songs
Songs written by Chris Bailey (musician)
Song recordings produced by Bruce Springsteen
Columbia Records singles
Mushroom Records singles